Parliamentary elections were held in Andorra on 4 March 2001.
The result was a victory for the Liberal Party of Andorra, which won 15 of the 28 seats. Its leader, Marc Forné Molné, remained Prime Minister. Voter turnout was 81.6%.

Results

By constituency

References

External links
Official government election site

Andorra
2001 in Andorra
Parliamentary elections in Andorra
March 2001 events in Europe